Ken Peplowski (born May 23, 1959) is an American jazz clarinetist and tenor saxophonist.  He was born in Cleveland, Ohio, United States, and known primarily for playing swing music. For over a decade, Peplowski recorded for Concord Records.

In 2007, Peplowski was named jazz advisor of Oregon Festival of American Music and music director of Jazz Party at The Shedd, both in Eugene, Oregon.

Awards and honors
 Best Jazz Record of the Year, Preis der deutschen Schallplattenkritik, The Natural Touch (1992)
The Satchmo Award presented by the Jazz Club of Sarasota in March, 2014

Discography

As leader/co-leader 
 Double Exposure (Concord Jazz, 1988) – recorded in 1987
 Sonny Side (Concord Jazz, 1989)
 The Ken Peplowski Quintet, Mr. Gentle and Mr. Cool (Concord Jazz, 1990)
 Illuminations (Concord Jazz, 1991)
 Natural Touch (Concord Jazz, 1992)
 Steppin' with Peps (Concord Jazz, 1993)
 Ken Peplowski and Howard Alden with Howard Alden (Concord Jazz, 1993) – recorded in 1992
 Live at Ambassador Auditorium (Concord Jazz, 1994)
 Encore with Howard Alden (Concord Jazz, 1995)
 It's a Lonesome Old Town (Concord Jazz, 1995)
 The Other Portrait (Concord Concerto, 1996)
 Grenadilla (Concord Jazz, 1998)
 Last Swing of the Century (Concord Jazz, 1999)
 The Feeling of Jazz with Tommy Newsom (Arbors, 1999)
 Just Friends with George Masso (Nagel-Heyer, 2002)
 Easy to Remember (Nagel-Heyer, 2004)
 Memories of You (Venus, 2006)	 – recorded in 2005
 When You Wish Upon a Star (Venus, 2007) – recorded in 2006
 Happy Together: Live at Birdland Volume One with Jesper Thilo (Nagel-Heyer, 2008)
 Pow-Wow with Howard Alden (Arbors, 2008)
 Ken Peplowski Gypsy Jazz Band, Gypsy Lamento (Venus, 2008) – recorded in 2007
 Every Time We Say Goodbye (Venus, 2008) – recorded in 2007
 Stardust with the New York Trio (Venus, 2009) – recorded in 2008
 E Pluribus Duo with Dick Hyman (Victoria, 2009)
 Noir Blue (Capri, 2010)
 Like a Lover with Nicki Parrott (Venus, 2011) – recorded in 2017
 In Search Of (Capri, 2011)
 Live at the Kitano with Dick Hyman (Victoria, 2013)
 Maybe September (Capri, 2013)
 The Clarinet Maestros with Julian Marc Stringle, Craig Milverton (Merfangle, 2015)
 At the Watermill with Alan Barnes (Woodville, 2015)
 Enrapture (Capri, 2016)
 Duologue with Adrian Cunningham (Arbors, 2018) – recorded in 2010
 Amizade with Diego Figueiredo (Arbors, 2019)
 Ken Peplowski Quartet, Petite Fluer (Venus, 2019) – recorded in 2018

As sideman 

With Charlie Byrd
 The Bossa Nova Years (Concord, 1991)
 Aquarelle (Concord Concerto, 1994)
 Moments Like This (Concord, 1994)
 Homage to Jobim (Concord Picante, 2005)

With Eddie Higgins
 It's Magic (Venus, 2006)
 It's Magic Vol.2 (Venus, 2007)
 A Handful of Stars (Venus, 2009)

With Dick Hyman
 Swing Is Here (Reference, 1996)
 E Pluribus Duo (Victoria, 2009)
 Live at the Kitano (Victoria, 2013)

With Susannah McCorkle
 No More Blues (Concord Jazz, 1989)
 From Bessie to Brazil (Concord Jazz, 1993)
 From Broadway to Bebop (Concord Jazz, 1994)
 Easy to Love: The Songs of Cole Porter (Concord Jazz, 1996)

With Nicki Parrott
 Like a Lover (Venus, 2011)
 The Look of Love (Venus, 2014)
 Yesterday Once More: The Carpenters Song Book (Venus, 2016)

With Leon Redbone
 Red to Blue (August 1985)
 Sugar (Private Music, 1990)
 Up a Lazy River (Private Music, 1992)
 Whistling in the Wind (Private Music, 1994)
 Any Time (Blue Thumb, 2001)

With Randy Sandke
 Stampede (Jazzology, 1992)
 I Hear Music (Concord Jazz, 1993)
 The Bix Beiderbecke Era (Nagel-Heyer, 1993)
 The Re-discovered Louis and Bix (Nagel-Heyer, 2000)
 Inside Out (Nagel-Heyer, 2002)
 Randy Sandke Meets Bix Beiderbecke (Nagel-Heyer, 2002)
 The Music of Bob Haggart (Arbors, 2002)

With Loren Schoenberg
 Time Waits for No One (Musicmasters, 1987)
 Solid Ground (Musicmasters, 1988)
 Just A-Settin' and A-Rockin'  (Musicmasters, 1990)

With Mel Torme 
 Mel Tormé and the Marty Paich Dektette – Reunion (Concord, 1988)
 Mel Tormé and the Marty Paich Dektette – In Concert Tokyo (Concord, 1988)
 Sing Sing Sing (Concord, 1992)
 A Tribute to Bing Crosby (Concord, 1994)

With others
 Howard Alden, The Howard Alden Trio Plus Special Guests Ken Peplowski & Warren Vache (Concord Jazz, 1989)
 Steve Allen, Steve Allen Plays Jazz Tonight (Concord Jazz, 1993)
 Lucie Arnaz, Just in Time (Concord Jazz, 1993)
 Eden Atwood, Cat on a Hot Tin Roof (Concord Jazz, 1994)
 Dan Barrett, Strictly Instrumental (Concord Jazz, 1987)
 Cheryl Bentyne, the Gershwin Songbook (ArtistShare, 2010)
 Ruby Braff, Cornet Chop Suey (Concord Jazz, 1994)
 Jim Cullum Jr., Fireworks! Red Hot & Blues (Riverwalk, Live from the Landing, 1996)
 Kenny Davern, The Jazz KENNection (Arbors, 2001)
 Peter Ecklund, Peter Ecklund and the Melody Makers (Stomp Off, 1988)
 Lars Erstrand, Beautiful Friendship (Sittel, 1992)
 Marianne Faithfull, Easy Come Easy Go (Naive, 2008)
 Marty Grosz, Acoustic Heat (Sackville, 2006)
 Scott Hamilton, Groovin' High (Concord Jazz, 1992)
 Hank Jones, Lazy Afternoon (Concord Jazz, 1989)
 Rebecca Kilgore, Rebecca Kilgore with the Keith Ingham Sextet (Jump, 2001)
 Erich Kunzel, Route 66: That Nelson Riddle Sound (Telarc, 2000)
 Barbara Lea, At the Atlanta Jazz Party (Jazzology, 1993)
 Peggy Lee, Love Held Lightly (Angel, 1993)
 Jay Leonhart, Sensitive to the Touch: The Music of Harold Arlen (Groove Jams, 1998)
 George Masso, Trombone Artistry (Nagel-Heyer, 1995)
 Michael Moore, The History of Jazz, Volume 1 (Arbors, 2000)
 Michael Moore, The History of Jazz, Volume 2 (Arbors, 2000)
 Tommy Newsom, The Feeling of Jazz (Arbors, 1999)
 John Pizzarelli, Let There Be Love (Telarc, 2000)
 John Pizzarelli, Italian Intermezzo (Menus and Music, 2000)
 Spike Robinson, George Masso, Play Arlen (Hep, 1992)
 Marilyn Scott, Every Time We Say Goodbye (Venus, 2008)
 George Shearing, George Shearing in Dixieland (Concord Jazz, 1989)
 Andy Stein, Goin' Places (Stomp Off, 1987)
 Various, Sweet and Lowdown (soundtrack) (Sony Classical 1999)
 Frank Vignola, Let It Happen (Concord Jazz, 1994)
 Terry Waldo, Footlight Varieties (Stomp Off, 1990)
 Carol Welsman, I Like Men (Welcar, 2009)
 Carol Welsman, Memories of You (Fab, 2009)
 Paula West, Come What May (Hi Horse 2001)

Publications
 Frank Barrett and Ken Peplowski (Sep. - Oct., 1998) "Minimal Structures within a Song: An Analysis of 'All of Me, Organization Science Vol. 9, No. 5

References

External links
 Official site

1959 births
Living people
Jazz musicians from Ohio
Musicians from Cleveland
20th-century American male musicians
21st-century American male musicians
20th-century clarinetists
20th-century saxophonists
21st-century clarinetists
21st-century American saxophonists
American jazz clarinetists
Concord Records artists
Dixieland clarinetists
Dixieland revivalist clarinetists
Dixieland revivalist saxophonists
Dixieland saxophonists
Jazz clarinetists
Mainstream jazz clarinetists
Mainstream jazz saxophonists
Statesmen of Jazz members
Swing clarinetists
Swing saxophonists
Arbors Records artists
Nagel-Heyer Records artists